Ilaitia Tuilau, sometimes spelled Laitia, (born 8 May 1987) is a Fijian footballer who can play as a defender as well as a defensive midfielder plays for Fijian club Lautoka and the Fiji national team.

Club career
Tuilau started his career with Lautoka. After a few years he joined Lautoka for a short stint. After that he went on to Papua New Guinea and Vanuatu to play OFC Champions League football with Hekari United and Amicale. In 2016 he returned home to play for his first club: Lautoka.

National team
Tuilau made his debut for the Fiji national football team at the age of 21 in a 2-0 win against New Zealand on November 19, 2008. After this he didn't play for the squad for almost three years. In 2011 he was called up again for the 2011 Pacific Games where he played four games. After this games it took five years before he was called up again. Now for a friendly game against Malaysia. Since then he has got regular call ups for the national team.

References

1987 births
Living people
Fijian footballers
Association football defenders
Association football midfielders
Labasa F.C. players
Lautoka F.C. players
Amicale F.C. players
Fiji international footballers
2012 OFC Nations Cup players